Rooms Katholieke Sport Vereniging Scherpenheuvel is a Curaçaoan football team located in Scherpenheuvel, and playing in the Sekshon Pagá since the 2015 season. The club has previously played at the topflight  of the Netherlands Antilles, having won the Curaçao League First Division twice,  in both the 1964–65 and 1968–69 seasons, and the Netherlands Antilles Championship once in 1967. Participating in the 1968 CONCACAF Champions' Cup. They were eliminated by SV Transvaal from Suriname 4–2 on aggregate.

Current squad 
November 2021

Honours
Netherlands Antilles Championship: 1
 1967

Curaçao League First Division: 3
 1964–65, 1968–69, 2019-20

Performance in CONCACAF competition
CONCACAF Champions' Cup: 1 appearance
CONCACAF Champions' Cup 1968 – First Round – (Caribbean Zone) – Lost to  SV Transvaal 4–2 in the global result.

References

Football clubs in Curaçao
Football clubs in the Netherlands Antilles
Association football clubs established in 1950